The Eclipse Award of Merit is part of the American Eclipse Awards in Thoroughbred horse racing. The industry's highest honor, it is presented to an individual or entity displaying outstanding lifetime achievement in, and service to, the Thoroughbred industry.

First awarded in 1976, the Eclipse Award of Merit is voted on by a panel of representatives from the National Thoroughbred Racing Association, Daily Racing Form and the National Turf Writers Association.

Winners
2021 - Earle I. Mack
2019 - No Award Presented
2018 - Joe Harper
2017 - No Award Presented
2016 - Andrew Beyer / Steven Crist
2015 - Leonard Lavin
2014 - Tom Durkin
2013 - D. Wayne Lukas
2012 - Nick Nicholson 
2011 - W. Cothran "Cot" Campbell
2010 - Claiborne Farm / Marylou Whitney
2009 - William S. Farish III, Lane's End Farm
2008 - Alice Headley Chandler of Mill Ridge Farm
2007 - No Award Presented
2006 - John A. Nerud
2005 - Penny Chenery
2004 - The Cella Family
2003 - Richard L. Duchossois
2002 - Ogden Phipps / Howard Battle
2001 - Harry T. Mangurian Jr. / Pete Pederson
2000 - Jim McKay
1999 - No award presented
1998 - D. G. Van Clief Jr.
1997 - Bob and Beverly Lewis
1996 - Allen E. Paulson
1995 - James E. "Ted" Bassett III
1994 - Alfred G. Vanderbilt II
1993 - Paul Mellon
1992 - Joe Hirsch / Robert P. Strub
1991 - Fred W. Hooper
1990 - Warner L. Jones Jr.
1989 - Michael Sandler
1988 - John Forsythe
1987 - James B. Faulconer
1986 - Herman Cohen
1985 - Keene Daingerfield
1984 - John R. Gaines
1981 - Bill Shoemaker
1980 - John D. Shapiro
1979 - Frank E. Kilroe
1978 - Ogden Mills Phipps
1977 - Steve Cauthen
1976 - Jack J. Dreyfus

References
 The Eclipse Awards at the Thoroughbred Racing Associations of America, Inc.
 The Bloodhorse.com Champion's history charts

Horse racing awards
Horse racing in the United States